Zhang Chujun (born 14 May 1976) is a Chinese windsurfer who competed in the 2000 Summer Olympics.

References

1976 births
Living people
Olympic sailors of China
Chinese female sailors (sport)
Chinese windsurfers
Sailors at the 2000 Summer Olympics – Mistral One Design
Female windsurfers